The Josiah B. Whitman House is a historic house located in Barnstable, Massachusetts.

Description and history 
The two story wood-frame house was built c. 1860 by Josiah Whitman. It is a well-preserved local example of vernacular Second Empire styling. It has the characteristic mansard roof, with eaves decorated by heavy brackets. The entry is offset to the left side, with a portico that is also heavily bracketed. A wing, also mansard-roofed, extends to the southwest at the rear of the main block. Bay windows project from the front and side, topped with roofs whose cornices are also bracketed.

The house was listed on the National Register of Historic Places in 1987.

See also
National Register of Historic Places listings in Barnstable County, Massachusetts

References

Houses in Barnstable, Massachusetts
National Register of Historic Places in Barnstable, Massachusetts
Houses on the National Register of Historic Places in Barnstable County, Massachusetts
Houses completed in 1860
Second Empire architecture in Massachusetts